Edmonton/Josephburg Aerodrome , also known as Warren Thomas (Josephburg) Aerodrome, is located  north of Josephburg in Strathcona County, Alberta, Canada.

See also
List of airports in the Edmonton Metropolitan Region

References

External links
Place to Fly on COPA's Places to Fly airport directory

Aviation in Edmonton
Edmonton Metropolitan Region
Registered aerodromes in Alberta
Transport in Strathcona County